Han Yuqun (born 1943 in Suining, Jiangsu province) is a Chinese politician. He is vice-chairman of the Financial and Economic Committee of the National People's Congress. He was also governor of Shandong Province.

Career

Han Yuqun joined the Communist Party of China (CPC) in 1975. He has served as deputy secretary of the CPC Jining City Committee in Shandong province, secretary of the CPC committee of Jining City, and head of the United Front Work Department of the CPC committee of Shandong province.

In 1993 he was elected member of the standing committee of the CPC committee of Shandong province. Han served as vice-governor of Shandong province from 1995 to 1998, and then as governor from 2003 to 2007. He is currently vice-chairman of the Financial and Economic Committee of the National People's Congress.

In 2011, Yuqun took part in a visit of China's legislators to Cambodia, which aimed to boost economic ties.

References

1943 births
Living people
People's Republic of China politicians from Jiangsu
Chinese Communist Party politicians from Jiangsu
Politicians from Xuzhou